Jyoti Punwani is a freelance Indian Journalist who has reported for various newspapers including Indian Express,  Times of India, The Hindu, DNA and other news media including Economic & Political Weekly, Scroll.in and The Hoot.

References

External links
 

Year of birth missing (living people)
Living people
Journalists from Maharashtra
Indian women journalists